The Moore Brothers were three Irish born brothers who became famous in the motion picture business in early Hollywood.

 Tom Moore (actor) (1883–1955)
 Owen Moore (1886–1939)
 Matt Moore (actor) (1888–1960)

See also 
 List of people with surname Moore